Albergen is a village in the Dutch province of Overijssel. It is a part of the municipality of Tubbergen, and lies about 7 km east of Almelo.

Services
Albergen has few services, because a lot of services can be found in bigger towns surrounding Albergen. However there is a church, Sint Pancratiuskerk, a primary school, a supermarket and a gym.

Culture
Albergen is known for its carnival and its Whitsun Fair. The carnival parade happens to be the first one in the year in Twente. During the Whitsunday Fair, at Pentecost, famous Dutch artists perform, such as Bløf, Van Dik Hout, and Di-rect.

The town's most notable current inhabitant is Bent Viscaal, an FIA Formula 3 driver currently driving his way up the ladder to Formula 1.

References

Populated places in Overijssel
Twente
Tubbergen